"Body and Soul (That's the Way It's Got to Be)" is the debut single by the American Soul/R&B vocal group, Soul Generation. The song was written by producer Paul Kyser and released in April 1972.

Background
Soul Generation recorded the single at A & R Recording Studios in New York, and it was produced by Paul Kyser and Harvey Posner arranged by producer, Stan Vincent. The single became a Top 40 hit spending 11 weeks on Billboards R&B/Soul Chart and peaking at #27 in May 1972. The single was released on Ebony Sound Records and distributed by Hilary Records, Inc. The B-side, "Mandingo Woman" was written by, Irwin Levine, L. Russell Brown.

Personnel
Cliff Perkins, Earl Davenport, Jeffrey Burgess, and Herman Hammonds.

References

External links

1972 singles